I.Q. Dudettes is a 2000 Hong Kong drama film directed by Frankie Chan and produced by David Chan.

Cast
 Frankie Chan
 Colleen Chan
 Irene Santiago Casiano
 Monica Chan
 Yat Ning Chan
 Ho Wai Chang
 Audrey Fang
 Siu Ming Fu

References

External links
 
 Hong Kong Cinemagic entry

2000 films
2000 comedy-drama films
Hong Kong comedy-drama films
2000s Cantonese-language films
Films directed by Frankie Chan
2000s Hong Kong films